Alfred Maurer (2 December 1888 Tallinn - 20 September 1954 Stockholm) was an Estonian lawyer and politician. He was a member of I Riigikogu. He was a member of the Riigikogu since 6 December 1922. He replaced Sergei Andrejev.

References

1888 births
1954 deaths
20th-century Estonian lawyers
Members of the Riigikogu, 1920–1923
Members of the Riiginõukogu
Estonian World War II refugees
Estonian emigrants to Sweden
Politicians from Tallinn